Nowsud District is a district (bakhsh) in Paveh County, Kermanshah Province, Iran. At the 2006 census, its population was 7,984, in 2,239 families.  The District has two cities: Nowsud and Nowdeshah. The District has one rural district (dehestan): Sirvan Rural District.

References 

Paveh County
Districts of Kermanshah Province